A Hog Fry is a traditional Oklahoma Cherokee social meal in which large iron kettles are placed over open fires. The kettles are then filled with oil or lard. Pieces of pork are then thrown in the hot oil and fried until cooked.

Hog fries are held regularly by tribal, cultural and church groups as well as by individual families.

The social aspect of cooking a whole hog at a Hog Fry is similar to the whole hog barbecue tradition of the Carolinas (but with a different method of cooking).

See also
 Barbecue in Oklahoma
 Native American cuisine

References

Oklahoma cuisine
Barbecue
Cherokee culture
Native American cuisine
American pork dishes
Deep fried foods